Muthenna Air Base is a former Iraqi Air Force base in the Baghdad Governorate of Iraq. It was captured by U.S.-led Coalition forces during Operation Iraqi Freedom in 2003.

Overview
Muthenna was an Iraqi military facility west of the center of Baghdad. It consisted of one 3,000 m asphalt/concrete runway sited in a developed industrial/residential area.

The base was one of several Iraqi Air Force airfields in the mid-1970s which were re-built under project "Super-Base" in response to the experiences from Arab–Israeli wars in 1967 and 1973.

It was a highly important airfield, with the headquarters of the Central (or 1st) Air Defence Sector located there. Muthenna was also the main base of the No 31 Transport Squadron IrAF, equipped with different transport aircraft flown by several detachments, and the "Special VIP-Squadron" IrAAC, that flew two VIP-configured Westland Commandos, three SA.330 Puma, and several MBB Bo.105 helicopters. It was the home base for Iraqi Air Force transport squadrons and navigation school.

During the 1980s a detachment of two Mi-25s of the 4th Sqn IrAAC, used for armed escort of the VIPs, was frequently based at Muthenna as well, and in 1991 a detachment of the No. 5 Sqn IrAF, equipped with MiG-29s, was based here.

Muthenna was among the airbases bombed during Operation Kaman 99, which was launched by Iranian air force the day after the Iraqi invasion of Iran and the beginning of the Iran–Iraq War of 1980s.

During the 1991 Gulf War, three of Baghdad's 42 targets—Iraqi air force headquarters, Muthenna airfield, and Ba'ath party headquarters—absorbed 20 percent of the effort. The Ba'ath party headquarters were hit with 28 bombs, Iraqi air force headquarters with 17, and Muthenna airfield with 25. The damage at Muthenna was so extensive that it was subsequently abandoned as a functioning aviation facility.

After the 2003 invasion of Iraq, the site was used as a forward operating base by the United States Army.

References

  Iraqi Super-Bases
 Muthenna Air Base

Iraqi Air Force bases